The Thyolo alethe or Cholo alethe (Chamaetylas choloensis) is an endangered species of bird in the family Muscicapidae. It is found in Malawi and Mozambique. It is named after Thyolo, a nearby town in Malawi. Its natural habitat is subtropical or tropical moist montane forests. It is most threatened by habitat loss due to deforestation, fires, and human activities.

Description
This bird has rust-coloured upper parts and white underparts with grey plumage on the sides of its face and neck. It has flesh-coloured legs and a dark brown tail with white tips.

References

Thyolo alethe
Birds of East Africa
Thyolo alethe
Thyolo alethe
South Malawi montane forest–grassland mosaic
Taxonomy articles created by Polbot